Geoff Thompson  is a British karate fighter. He is the winner of multiple European Karate Championships and World Karate Championships medals. Thompson was appointed Member of the Order of the British Empire (MBE) in the 1995 New Year Honours for services to sport, particularly karate. He is the founder and executive chair of the Youth Charter, a charity established in 1993.

Thompson has also been appointed a Deputy Lieutenant of Greater Manchester and a Fellow of the Royal Society of Arts.

Achievements

 1982  World Karate Championships Gold Medal
 1983  European Karate Championships Silver Medal
 1985  World Games  Kumite Gold Medal
 1986  World Karate Championships Silver Medal

Video game
In 1985, Thompson was signed to promote the game Way of the Exploding Fist.

References

External links
 

Year of birth missing (living people)
Living people
English male karateka
Black British sportsmen
Wadō-ryū practitioners
World Games gold medalists
Members of the Order of the British Empire
Deputy Lieutenants of Greater Manchester
Competitors at the 1985 World Games